Ndete Napu is a fumarole field in the center of Flores island, Indonesia. It is located along the Lowomelo river valley and contains mudpots and high-pressure water fountains. The field is listed as an active volcano based on its thermal activity.

See also 

 List of volcanoes in Indonesia

References 

Mountains of Indonesia
Volcanoes of the Lesser Sunda Islands